General elections will be held in Trinidad and Tobago by 2025, to elect 41 members to the 13th Trinidad and Tobago Republican Parliament.

Electoral system
The 41 members of the House of Representatives are elected by first-past-the-post voting in single-member constituencies. Registered voters must be 18 years and over, must reside in an electoral district/constituency for at least two months prior to the qualifying date, be a citizen of Trinidad and Tobago or a Commonwealth citizen residing legally in Trinidad and Tobago for a period of at least one year.

If one party obtains a majority of seats, then that party is entitled to form the Government, with its leader as Prime Minister. If the election results in no single party having a majority, then there is a hung parliament. In this case, the options for forming the Government are either a minority government or a coalition government.

Parties and candidates
Political parties registered with the Elections and Boundaries Commission (EBC) can contest the general election as a party.

The leader of the party commanding a majority of support in the House of Representatives is the person who is called on by the president to form a government as Prime Minister, while the leader of the largest party or coalition not in government becomes the Leader of the Opposition.

Notes

References

Future elections in the Caribbean
2025